Canberra Airport  is an international airport situated in the District of Majura, Australian Capital Territory, serving Australia's capital city, Canberra, as well as the nearby city of Queanbeyan and regional areas of the Australian Capital Territory and southeastern New South Wales.

The airport serves direct flights to all Australian state capitals, as well as to many regional centres across the Australian east coast.  Direct international links previously operated from Canberra to Singapore and Wellington. While flights to Qatar also used to operate via Sydney.

Canberra Airport handled 3,217,391 passengers in the 2018–19 financial year. Major redevelopment work completed in 2013 included the demolition of the old terminal, replacing it with a new facility designed to handle up to 8 million passengers annually.

In addition to serving airline traffic, the airport is also the only public general aviation facility within the Australian Capital Territory. A former Royal Australian Air Force base – Defence Establishment Fairbairn is located within Canberra Airport and supports government VIP flying operations by 34 Squadron as well as ground handling for itinerant military aircraft and visiting heads of state.

Corporate management
The airport's controlling entity is Capital Property Finance Pty Ltd, which had a 2014–15 income of A$405 million. The airport is managed and operated by the Canberra Airport Group Pty Ltd. Terry Snow is the airport's executive chairman and his step-son, Stephen Byron, is the managing director.

History

Early years

The airport was built up from an old airstrip that was first laid down in the 1920s, not long after the National Capital site was decided. In 1939 it was taken over by the RAAF, with an area leased out for civil aviation.

On 13 August 1940, in what became known as the Canberra air disaster, a RAAF Lockheed Hudson flying from Melbourne crashed into a small hill to the east of the airport. Four crew and six passengers, including the Chief of the General staff and three Federal Government ministers, were killed in the accident. James Fairbairn, Minister for Air and Civil Aviation, was one of those killed and Fairbairn Airbase, the eastern component of the airport, was subsequently named after him. In 1962 the military side of the airport was renamed RAAF Base Fairbairn. The north-east quadrant of the airport still retains the Fairbairn name.

The terminal facilities on the western side were upgraded in 1988. By 1994, Canberra Airport was the seventh busiest in Australia, handling 1.4 million passengers annually. Prior to privatisation, the ACT Government recommended further development of the airport as an international gateway, capable of limited widebody operations to destinations in South-East Asia and the Pacific region, but noted there was little appetite from Australian airlines to establish such services 

The lease to the site was sold to Canberra International Airport Pty Ltd in 1998, and the RAAF area was sub-leased back to the Department of Defence. It was decommissioned as a RAAF base in 2003, (although No. 34 Squadron RAAF remains based there), and the RAAF area was renamed Defence Establishment Fairbairn.

In July 2004, Air Pacific launched twice weekly services between Canberra and Nadi, the first direct scheduled International link; however, these flights proved unsuccessful, prompting further investment in facilities to support International operations. In 2006 the main runway was upgraded to cater for heavier aircraft, allowing visiting dignitaries and heads of state to fly direct to the capital.

The airport's 2005 masterplan was criticised by the Federal government for not providing enough detail about planned expansion, while a further draft master plan was rejected by Federal Transport Minister Anthony Albanese in November 2008. The draft did not provide enough detail on a proposal to develop the airport into a freight hub, while that the airport's community consultation had also been insufficient. In the second half of 2008, Canberra International Airport Pty Ltd started referring to itself as "Canberra Airport".

Redevelopment and International flights
In early December 2007, plans were announced to construct a new terminal, to be completed by September 2010. This new terminal would have increased the number of aerobridges from two to six, doubled the number of check in counters and car parking and provided additional baggage processing capacity and lounge space. These plans were placed on hold in late 2008 as a result of the global economic crisis.

With financial outlooks improving, in April 2009, the airport announced that $350 million would be spent towards a new terminal and key infrastructure projects, including:
 three new jet aircraft parking positions and a total of ten aerobridges
 an increase in check-in counters from 17 to 44
 two multi-story car parks connected to the terminal
 a split-level roadside drop off and pick up system
 dedicated customs, immigration and quarantine facilities to support International flights
 an indoor taxi rank and waiting area – a first for an Australian airport
The terminal's Southern concourse was completed in late 2010, while the Western concourse was partially open in March 2013 and complete by November of that year. Overall, floor space was increased by 65%, with significantly expanded baggage capacity and also expanded the airline lounges by four times compared to the previous building.

In November 2012, a national petition was started by 10-year-old Eve Cogan to name the new extensions after David Warren, inventor of the blackbox. The petition was supported by Captain C.B. "Sully" Sullenberger.

In 2010, 8 Brindabella Circuit, a building located in the administration area of the Airport precinct, won the 5 Green Stars Australian Excellence Award.

In January 2016, Singapore Airlines announced it would launch flights from Singapore to Wellington via Canberra with Boeing 777-200ER aircraft, dubbed the "Capital Express" service. The ACT Government and Canberra Airport had been attempting for years to attract foreign airlines, or persuade Qantas or Virgin Australia to commence international flights from Canberra, with a population catchment of 900,000. The airport is underserviced compared to Adelaide which has 42 weekly international services with a population catchment only 25% larger. Canberra's status as Australia's capital city and the above average income of residents in the surrounding area provide arguments in favour of more international services at the airport. Qatar Airways began daily flights between Canberra and Doha, via Sydney, in February 2018. The product offering was upgraded in November 2019, replacing the Boeing 777-300ER aircraft used on the route with new A350-1000s 

On 24 January 2018, Singapore Airlines announced that it was ending its Canberra to Wellington service on 30 April 2018, altering its Canberra operations to a daily Singapore-Sydney-Canberra-Singapore service from 1 May 2018 using the Boeing 777-300ER aircraft.

COVID-19 pandemic
Interstate travel restrictions as a result of the COVID-19 pandemic dramatically impacted operations at Canberra Airport. By August 2020, the airport reported a 99% reduction in passengers and closed the terminal on Saturdays as a cost saving measure, while management criticised State governments for enforcing border closures with the ACT, despite there being no active community transmission of the virus in the Territory. In September, Singapore Airlines announced the permanent suspension of its Canberra operations. Easing of travel restrictions in late September saw resumption and increased frequency on some interstate routes, avoiding further reduction to five days per week operations. This increased demand was followed by the announcement of several new leisure focussed, regional routes.

Canberra Airport received three one-off repatriation flights to bring home Australians stranded overseas, including a Qantas flight from New Delhi, a Nepal Airlines flight piloted by film star Vijaya Lama and a Singapore Airlines flight with 150 passengers. 

On 17 July 2020, Qantas carried passengers on a scenic flight aboard its final Boeing 747 from Canberra Airport over the capital and surrounding region. The special flight, touted as a public farewell for the 747 long-haul fleet, had originally been planned over Melbourne, but was changed to Canberra due to Victorian lockdowns and also performed low fly-pasts of the airport and the city landmarks.

Singapore Airlines and Qatar Airways cancelled their flights to Canberra in 2020 due to the pandemic. As of January 2023, Qatar had postponed the resumption of these flights on several occasions and there was no date for them to return. Singapore Airlines had also not announced a date by which it would resume servicing Canberra. The airport and ACT government have sought to attract flights to New Zealand and Fiji, but without success.

Facilities

The Canberra Spatial Plan released by the ACT Government in March 2004 identified the airport and surrounding areas as being an important centre for future industrial and related development. The airport precinct is currently divided into four areas, catering to aviation and non-aviation activities:

The passenger terminal and general aviation facilities are in the south western quadrant formed by runways 17/35 and 12/30. This area also contains long and short term parking and a four-star hotel.
The Brindabella Business Park is south of the passenger terminal. A heavy maintenance facility for QantasLink Boeing 717 aircraft is located adjacent to the business park.
Fairbairn, a former RAAF base is on the eastern side of the main runway. In addition to military and VIP aircraft operations, this area contains the Air Traffic Control tower, aircraft rescue and firefighting (ARFF) facilities and remote parking for visiting heavy aircraft and diverted passenger flights.
A retail and mixed use area north of runway 12/30, on Majura Road which has been named Majura Park. Tenants include Majura Park Shopping Centre, Costco, IKEA, and some office buildings.

Passenger terminals
Before the airport redevelopment in 2009 there was a single building made up of two terminals. The former Qantas Terminal was located on the western side of the building. All Qantas and QantasLink flights and related services such as lounges now operate from the new Southern Concourse Terminal. The former terminal was demolished in 2011 to make way for the building of the second Western Concourse Terminal.

The former Common User Terminal was located on the far eastern side of the building. The terminal served Virgin Australia and briefly Tigerair Australia. Also until 2001 the terminal was the home of Ansett Australia's operations from the airport. However, after the construction of the new Southern Concourse, only the terminal's departure lounge and gates 5 and 6 were in use. The Common User terminal was demolished in June 2013 after the opening of new Southern Concourse.

Southern Concourse
Construction of the Southern Concourse was completed in late 2010 and came into service on 14 November. Qantas uses its check-in counters and departure gates. The Southern Concourse also includes The Qantas Club, The Qantas Business Class Lounge and The Qantas chairman's Lounge. The building's two wings, the Southern Concourse and the Western Concourse, are separated by an atrium, the centrepiece of the terminal.

Western Concourse
The Western Concourse opened in March 2013 and conjoins onto the Southern Concourse Terminal. Virgin Australia uses its check-in counters and departure gates. The Western Concourse also includes the 300-seat Virgin Lounge and Virgin's invitation-only The Club.

The western concourse was built with space for customs, immigration and quarantine facilities next to the Virgin lounge on the upper floor and on the ground floor. These areas were fitted out and opened when Singapore Airlines began its Canberra services to Wellington and Singapore. International flights arrive at and depart from gate 5.

General Aviation Terminal
The General Aviation Terminal in Canberra Airport is a small separate building located on the far west side of the Terminal Precinct. Brindabella Airlines had its head office and maintenance facility located near this terminal prior to the airline's collapse in 2013.

Airlines and destinations

Notes

General aviation

Role
As the only general aviation facility in the Australian Capital Territory and the surrounding districts, Canberra Airport plays a central role in the development of this segment of the industry. Up until the privatization of the airport the facility supported multiple, small airlines, flying schools and related aviation businesses. However, since the privatization of the airport the majority of these businesses have either relocated or ceased to exist. The Canberra Airport 2014 Master plan notes that since privatization of the airport there has been an expansion of the General Aviation precinct, but it also notes that other facilities are encroaching upon these areas and GA will be relocated to an as yet undefined location.

Capacity
While there has been a decline in general aviation related businesses the demand for hangar space for general aviation remains strong, with over 20 aircraft forced to park in the open exposed to the weather due to a lack of alternative options. The development of the site as a piece of prime real estate, exempt from some Territory planning laws, by the current leasee to cater to non-aviation businesses such as office space and general retail space, has created a situation where the potential revenue or the land is more valuable in this role than its intended purpose makes it unlikely that this situation will be resolved by market processes.

Controversy
During the COVID-19 pandemic, Canberra Airport announced that the runway 12/30 would be closed. As noted in the 2014 Canberra Airport Master plan, this runway is primarily used by general aviation and was considered by the Aircraft Owners and Pilots Association (AOPA) to be a thinly veiled attempt to unlock a larger area of the site for non-aviation purposes. There has also been a significant and ongoing criticism that the ongoing property development activities have been pursued to the detriment of aviation safety. For Canberra Airport, Airservices Australia has been obliged to put the following warning in its En Route Supplement Australia: "During strong westerly winds TURB may be experienced in touch down area LDG RWY 35." This warning of turbulence resulted from airline pilots complaining about a safety issue arising from severe turbulence caused by a hangar that was built too close to the runway. The hangar could have been placed further away from the runway if the land behind the hangar was not being used for non-aeronautical commercial development. Turbulence of this nature has a significantly higher impact upon the smaller aircraft used by general aviation.

Second airport
Due to the central location of Canberra International Airport, and the associated high value of underlying asset, there have been some calls for the creation of a second airport in the Canberra region. This requirement was recognized in the 1950s, but as yet no location or funding has been allocated to meet this requirement. In relation to the proposal to site a second airport in Williamsdale to the south of Canberra, Canberra International Airport indicated that they would not oppose this facility if the new site was also required to cater to a similar security regime as Canberra Airport.

Statistics

Total passengers and aircraft movements

Busiest domestic routes

Busiest international routes

Notes
^Since 1 May 2019 the Singapore Airline service operates via Sydney from Singapore and no more flights operate to Wellington.
The Doha service commenced on 12 February 2018.

Advertising
While billboards have been barred in Canberra since the 1930s, an amendment of the National Capital Plan in 2000 allowed them to be displayed at Canberra Airport. Subsequently, the airport has hosted advertisements promoting defence hardware.  A community group said the airport should not be promoting weapons manufacturers. The airport defended the ads and said the airport would continue to accept defence industry advertising. In 2015 the airport was lit up in rainbow colours, and in 2017 electronic and 3D message boards were used to support marriage equality. In August 2017 Canberra Airport awarded Qatar Media Services (QMS) the concession for all internal and external advertising.  The first advertising project will be a double-sided "landmark digital billboard", being the only installation of this type in the ACT.

Environment
Approach and departure corridors lie over largely rural and industrial areas, although the instrument approach path (from the south) passes near the New South Wales suburb of Jerrabomberra, the city of Queanbeyan, and the Royal Australian Navy base, HMAS Harman, which has some barracks and housing.

Proposals have been made to the NSW Planning Minister by various developers to approve housing estates that are under the southern flight paths in New South Wales. Canberra International Airport Pty Ltd has been vigorous in advertising its opposition to these plans on the basis of a general increase in noise levels over a wide corridor which is currently free of aircraft noise, and concern that this will lead to the imposition of a curfew on the hours-of-operation of the airport.

Ground transport

Access to the city from the airport is via Morshead Drive and Parkes Way and Pialligo Avenue to Queanbeyan. A major junction which connects the Majura Parkway and Monaro Highway with Canberra's east-west arterial road network is located adjacent to the airport. Travel time to Canberra from the airport is generally around 10 minutes. The road approaches to the airport and business parks have historically been prone to traffic congestion in peak times. In 2007, the Chief Minister, Jon Stanhope controversially attributed the congestion to the Federal Government permitting construction of office buildings on airport land. A report commissioned by the ACT Government, however, identified a range of factors contributing including population growth in Gungahlin and Queanbeyan and the expansion of the airport itself, calling for a staged approach to road improvements in the area. Major investment in upgrades aimed at improving access have progressively been completed since 2008 through joint funding from both Canberra Airport Group and the ACT Government.

Canberra Cabs and partner taxi companies provide services to the airport taxi rank. An enclosed waiting area was opened in November 2013, aiming to improve the experience for arriving passengers who would otherwise wait outside in Canberra's relative climate extremes. Hire car companies maintain a presence in the terminal and Uber pick-up and drop offs are permitted with a $3 fee charged to drivers.

ACTION resumed Route 11/11A to Canberra Airport's passenger terminal from the City bus interchange in 2017. The route operated with 64 services each week day, 26 services on a Saturday and 24 on Sundays. Route 11/11A has since been incorporated into route R3. Canberra Airport Express provides daytime mini-bus services to Canberra City, connecting to regional and Interstate coach services at the West Row bus station. Other local bus services operate through the airport precinct and Brindabella Business park, but do not stop at the terminal including former ACTION route 792 (peak hours) to/from Woden and Qcity Transit route 834 to Queanbeyan (Monday to Friday only).

On 10 February 2009, Canberra Airport released its preliminary draft master plan which announced that a high-speed rail link between Sydney, Canberra and Melbourne was being considered. The plan was shortlisted in December 2008 by Infrastructure Australia for further consideration; however, it was the most expensive project shortlisted, and has not attracted any funding from any government. The decision to build the Second Sydney Airport at Badgerys Creek has made a fast rail link to Canberra Airport unlikely in the foreseeable future.

Acccidents and incidents
 On 10 November 2022, a Link Airways Saab 340B, registered VH-VEQ operating on behalf of Virgin Australia as flight VA-633 from Canberra to Sydney made an emergency landing shortly after takeoff. A ratchet strap used to secure the left-hand propellor while the aircraft is on the ground was not removed by the crew before starting the engines. While accelerating on the runway, it penetrated the side of the fuselage into the passenger cabin as the aircraft became airborne. The aircraft landed safely seven minutes after departure and the airline reported no injuries to passengers. However, after landing the Australian Federal Police and Australian Transport Safety Bureau (ATSB) reported that between one and three passengers had sustained minor injuries. The ATSB classified the occurrence as a serious incident and opened an investigation.

See also 
 Transportation in Australia
 List of airports in territories of Australia

References

External links
 
 Official website

Airfields of the United States Army Air Forces in Australia
Airports in the Australian Capital Territory
Buildings and structures in Canberra
Transport in Canberra
International airports in Australia